Czesław Michniewicz (born 12 February 1970) is a Polish football manager and former player who managed the Poland national team in 2022.

Managerial career

Early years
In September 2003, Michniewicz was appointed as the manager of Lech Poznań. He led the side to the 2003–04 Polish Cup and Polish Super Cup titles. He left the club in June 2006. In October 2006, he was appointed manager of Ekstraklasa side Zagłębie Lubin, leading the club to the 2006–07 league title. In October 2007, he was relieved of his duties. From 8 July 2008 to 12 April 2009 he managed Arka Gdynia in the Ekstraklasa. From 15 November 2010 until 30 June 2011, he managed Widzew Łódź. On 22 July 2011, he was appointed as the manager of Jagiellonia Białystok, but left the position on 22 December 2011 by mutual consent. On 28 March 2012, Michniewicz was named as the new coach of Polonia Warsaw, which he led until 8 May 2012.

From 22 March to 22 October 2013, he managed Podbeskidzie Bielsko-Biała. After a year and a half pause, he was hired as the coach of Pogoń Szczecin. Michniewicz's side finished the league at sixth place in the 2015–16 season. Despite the best result in years, his contract was not renewed and he left the club on 30 June 2016. From 1 July 2016 to 22 March 2017, he was in charge of Bruk-Bet Termalica Nieciecza in Ekstraklasa.

Poland national under-21 football team
On 7 July 2017, he was appointed as the coach of the Poland under-21 national team. After defeating Portugal in the play-offs, Poland under his leadership qualified for the first time since 1994 for the final tournament of the 2019 UEFA European Under-21 Championship. On 15 October 2020, he was replaced by Maciej Stolarczyk.

Legia Warsaw
On 21 September 2020, he was appointed as the coach of Legia Warsaw. In his debut Legia won 2–0 over FC Drita at the 2020–21 UEFA Europa League qualifiers. On 18 October 2020, he made his Ekstraklasa debut, as Legia won 2–1 over Zagłębie Lubin. On 11 December 2020, he was named Ekstraklasa's Coach of the Month after Legia's successful run in November. He was awarded the same distinction for March 2021, as his team completed the campaign in the above-mentioned month without any defeat. On 28 April 2021, Michniewicz won his second Polish Championship after 0–0 draw between Jagiellonia Białystok and Raków Częstochowa (as the latter team had already lost mathematical chances of catching up with Legia), with three games to spare.

On 26 August 2021, Legia led by Michniewicz defeated SK Slavia Prague, and for the first time in five years qualified for the group stages of a European cup. They would face Leicester City, Napoli and Spartak Moscow in the UEFA Europa League group stage.

Although Legia led their group after wins against Spartak Moscow and Leicester City, they struggled in the league. After four consecutive defeats, managing nine points in ten fixtures and sitting 15th in the table, Michniewicz was dismissed on 25 October 2021.

Poland national team
On 31 January 2022, Michniewicz was named as the new manager of Poland, signing a deal until 31 December 2022 with an extension option, following the previous manager Paulo Sousa's decision to join Flamengo three months before Poland's first 2022 FIFA World Cup qualification play-offs game. He was scheduled to make his debut against Russia in Moscow, prior to the disqualification of Russia. On 24 March, Poland played their first match under Michniewicz, a 1–1 draw in a friendly against Scotland.

On 29 March 2022, Michniewicz led Poland to a 2–0 victory over Sweden in the World Cup qualification play-off final. On 30 November 2022, Poland advanced to the knockout stage of the 2022 FIFA World Cup for the first time since 1986 under the lead of Michniewicz. 

On 22 December 2022, following criticism of the national team's defensive tactics and style of play under Michniewicz by the media, a turmoil regarding bonuses for national team players and staff, Michniewicz blocking several journalists on Twitter before deleting his account, and reportedly shouldering part of the blame for the media fallout on team manager Jakub Kwiatkowski, it was announced Michniewicz's contract would not be extended and he was to leave his post on 31 December 2022.

Personal life

Michniewicz was born in Byarozawka, then in the Byelorussian SSR, Soviet Union (present-day Belarus), while his mother was visiting her family; but grew up in Biskupiec, Poland. On 20 June 1998, he married Grażyna Rzewuska, with whom he has two sons: Mateusz (born 22 January 2001) and Jakub (born 13 August 2003).

Managerial statistics

Honours

Player
Amica Wronki
Polish Cup: 1998–99, 1999–2000
Polish Super Cup: 1999

Manager
Lech Poznań
Polish Cup: 2004
Polish Super Cup: 2004

Zagłebie Lubin
Ekstraklasa: 2006–07
Polish Super Cup: 2007

Legia Warsaw
Ekstraklasa: 2020–21

References

External links
 
 

1970 births
I liga players
II liga players
Amica Wronki players
Arka Gdynia managers
Association football goalkeepers
Bałtyk Gdynia players
Bruk-Bet Termalica Nieciecza managers
Ekstraklasa players
Jagiellonia Białystok managers
Lech Poznań managers
Legia Warsaw managers
Living people
People from Lida District
People from Nowe Miasto County
Podbeskidzie Bielsko-Biała managers
Poland national football team managers
Pogoń Szczecin managers
Polish football managers
Polish footballers
Polonia Gdańsk players
Polonia Warsaw managers
Widzew Łódź managers
Zagłębie Lubin managers
2022 FIFA World Cup managers